Ahmad Sembiring Usman is an Indonesian footballer who currently plays for Gresik United as a midfielder.

References
 http://www.goal.com/id-ID/people/indonesia/22164/ahmad-sambiring
 

Indonesian footballers
Living people
1983 births
Sportspeople from North Maluku
People from Ternate
Persiter Ternate players
Persipur Purwodadi players
Arema F.C. players
Persisam Putra Samarinda players
Persiba Balikpapan players
Gresik United players
Indonesian Premier Division players
Liga 1 (Indonesia) players
Association football midfielders